MacEacharn and McEacharn are surnames.

People with the surnames
McEachern
Malcolm McEacharn – (1852–1910) – English born, Australian – Mayor of Melbourne.

References

Anglicised Scottish Gaelic-language surnames